Uiseong station is a railway station in Uiseong County, North Gyeongsang, South Korea. It is on the Jungang Line.

External links
 Cyber station information from Korail

Railway stations in North Gyeongsang Province
Uiseong County
Railway stations opened in 1940